Agathe (minor planet designation: 228 Agathe) is a stony main belt asteroid, about 9 kilometers in diameter. It was discovered by Johann Palisa on 19 August 1882 at Vienna Observatory, Austria. Photometric observations during 2003 showed a rotation period of 6.48 ± 0.01 hours with a brightness variation of 0.27 ± 0.03 in magnitude. An earlier study yielded results that are consistent with these estimates. On 23 August 2029 the asteroid will be  from Earth.

Agathe was named after the youngest daughter of Austrian astronomer Theodor von Oppolzer  (1841–1886), professor of astronomy in Vienna.

References

External links 
 Dictionary of Minor Planet Names, Google books
 The Asteroid Orbital Elements Database
 Minor Planet Discovery Circumstances
 
 

Background asteroids
Agathe
Agathe
S-type asteroids (Tholen)
S-type asteroids (SMASS)
18820819